Katherine Hogan (born October 22, 1991 as Katherine Cameron) is a Canadian curler from New Bothwell, Manitoba. She currently plays third on Team Casey Scheidegger.

Career
In 2008 Hogan skipped a team to win the U16 Provincial Championship. The team included Nicole Sigvaldason, Sheyna Andries and Emily Helston.

In 2010 Hogan lost the junior provincial final to Breanne Meakin. Hogan's team included Nicole Sigvaldason, Sheyna Andries and Kelsey Hinds. In 2012 again Hogan lost the junior provincial final to Shannon Birchard. Hogan threw last stones for Team Vandepoele, the team included skip, Alyssa Vandepoele, Abby Ackland and Sheyna Andries.

After juniors, Hogan graduated to a women's curling career. She won her first World Curling Tour event as a skip at the 2012 Atkins Curling Supplies Women's Classic. She skipped her team of Erika Sigurdson, Brandi Oliver and Lindsay Baldock at the 2013 Manitoba Scotties Tournament of Hearts where they finished with a 5–2 record.

In 2014 Hogan skipped her team, Erika Sigurdson, Sheyna Andries and Lindsay Baldock at the 2014 Manitoba Scotties Tournament of Hearts where they finished with a 2–5 record.

Hogan found herself joining curler Kristy McDonald. The team of Kristy McDonald, Kate Hogan, Leslie Wilson and Raunora Westcott immediately found success in winning their first WCT event, the Mother Club Fall Curling Classic. They went on to the 2015 Manitoba Scotties Tournament of Hearts, where they finished 5-2 losing the 2 vs. 2 game to Barb Spencer. The team did even better at the 2016 Manitoba Scotties Tournament of Hearts, finishing the round robin with a 6–1 record, and then made it to the final where they lost to Kerri Einarson.

McDonald retired from curling in 2016, so the rink had Saskatchewan resident Michelle Englot join the team as skip. The team played in the 2017 Manitoba Scotties Tournament of Hearts, going 5-2 after the round robin. The team then tore through the playoffs, defeating Olympic champion Jennifer Jones in the 1 vs. 1 game, and then beat Darcy Robertson in the final. The team represented Manitoba at the 2017 Scotties Tournament of Hearts, where they continued their success. They finished the round robin in first place with a 10–1 record. They then defeated Ontario's Rachel Homan in the 1 vs. 2 page playoff game, sending them to the final, where they again met Ontario in a re-match. They would not be as successful in the final, and the team had to settle for silver.

Their successful season qualified the team for the 2017 Canadian Olympic Curling Trials, but they would have less success there, finishing with a 2–6 record. However, as the Rachel Homan team won the event, and would go on to represent Canada at the Olympics, the Englot rink would be invited to play as Team Canada at the 2018 Scotties Tournament of Hearts, a spot normally reserved for the defending champions. There, the team finished with a 6–5 record, in sixth place, missing the playoffs. Also that season, the team would play in the 2018 Continental Cup of Curling.

In March 2018, Hogan announced she was joining a Winnipeg-based team skipped by Allison Flaxey, with second Taylor McDonald and lead Raunora Westcott. The team participated in two Slams and finished sixth at the 2019 Manitoba Scotties Tournament of Hearts.

On March 15, 2019, it was announced that Hogan would join the new team of Laura Walker, Taylor McDonald and Nadine Scotland for the 2019–20 curling season. They did not qualify for the playoffs in their first two events, the 2019 Cargill Curling Training Centre Icebreaker and the Booster Juice Shoot-Out before winning the 2019 Mother Club Fall Curling Classic after posting a perfect 7–0 record. Hogan won her second provincial title when the team defeated Kelsey Rocque 7–4 in the 2020 Alberta Scotties Tournament of Hearts final. Representing Alberta at the 2020 Scotties Tournament of Hearts, the team finished pool play with a 3–4 record, failing to qualify for the championship round. It would be the team's last event of the season as both the Players' Championship and the Champions Cup Grand Slam events were cancelled due to the COVID-19 pandemic.

Due to the pandemic, the 2021 Alberta Scotties were cancelled, so Curling Alberta appointed the Walker rink to represent the province at the 2021 Scotties Tournament of Hearts. Team Walker's regular lead Nadine Scotland, who was three-months pregnant, opted not to play in the tournament, which was being held in a "bubble" due to the pandemic. She was replaced by Rachel Brown. At the Scotties, the team finished with a 9–3 round robin record, tied for third with Manitoba, skipped by Jennifer Jones. Alberta beat Manitoba in the tiebreaker, but lost in the semifinal against the defending champion Team Canada rink, skipped by Kerri Einarson, settling for a bronze medal.

In just their second event of the 2021–22 season, Team Walker reached the final of the 2021 Alberta Curling Series: Saville Shoot-Out where they were defeated by Kim Eun-jung. Due to the pandemic, the qualification process for the 2021 Canadian Olympic Curling Trials had to be modified to qualify enough teams for the championship. In these modifications, Curling Canada created the 2021 Canadian Curling Trials Direct-Entry Event, an event where five teams would compete to try to earn one of three spots into the 2021 Canadian Olympic Curling Trials. Team Walker qualified for the Trials Direct-Entry Event due to their CTRS ranking from the 2019–20 season. At the event, the team went 2–2 through the round robin, qualifying for the tiebreaker round where they faced British Columbia's Corryn Brown. After being defeated by Brown in the first game, Team Walker won the second tiebreaker to secure their spot at the Olympic Trials. The team had one more event before the Trials, the 2021 National Grand Slam, where they lost in the quarterfinals to Tracy Fleury. A few weeks later, they competed in the Olympic Trials, held November 20 to 28 in Saskatoon, Saskatchewan. At the event, the team had mixed results, ultimately finishing in sixth place with a 3–5 record.

A few weeks before the Alberta provincial championship, Team Walker won the Alberta Curling Series: Avonair tour event, defeating Casey Scheidegger in the final. They then competed in the 2022 Alberta Scotties Tournament of Hearts, where they posted a 6–1 record through the round robin. This created a three-way tie between Walker, Scheidegger and the Kelsey Rocque rink, however, as Walker had to best draw shot challenge between the three rinks, they advanced directly to the final. There, they met the Scheidegger rink, who defeated Rocque in the semifinal. After a tight final, Walker secured the victory for her team with a draw to the eight-foot to win 6–5. This qualified the team for their second straight national championship. At the 2022 Scotties Tournament of Hearts, the team could not replicate their success from 2021, finishing the round robin with a 3–5 record and missing the playoffs. Team Walker wrapped up their season at the 2022 Players' Championship where they missed the playoffs.

On March 17, 2022, the team announced that they would be disbanding at the end of the 2021–22 season. It was later announced that Hogan and teammate Taylor McDonald would be joining Casey Scheidegger and Jessie Haughian for the 2022–23 season. Scheidegger would skip the team, with Hogan playing third, Haughian at second and McDonald at lead.

Personal life
Hogan works as a paralegal at Tapper Cuddy LLP. She has one stepson. She married Jordan Hogan in 2022.

Teams

Notes

References

External links

 Video: 

Living people
Canadian women curlers
1991 births
Curlers from Winnipeg
People from Eastman Region, Manitoba
Continental Cup of Curling participants
Canada Cup (curling) participants
20th-century Canadian women
21st-century Canadian women